The 1976 Illinois gubernatorial election was held in Illinois on November 2, 1976. Incumbent first-term Democratic governor Dan Walker lost renomination to Illinois Secretary of State Michael Howlett, who was an ally of Chicago mayor Richard J. Daley. Howlett then lost the general election to Republican nominee James R. Thompson. This election was the first of seven consecutive Republican gubernatorial victories in Illinois, a streak not broken until the election of Democrat Rod Blagojevich in 2002.

Election information
This election was for a two-year term which would synchronize future gubernatorial elections with midterm election years, rather than presidential election years, as the 1970 Constitution of Illinois required gubernatorial elections to be held in midterm election years starting in 1978. The previous election had been in 1972.

The primaries (held on March 16) and general election  coincided with those for federal offices (United States President and House) and those for other state offices. The election was part of the 1976 Illinois elections.

Turnout
Turnout in the primaries saw 38.79% in the gubernatorial primaries, with a total of 2,231,910 votes cast, and 33.89% in the lieutenant gubernatorial primary, with 1,949,469 votes cast.

Turnout during the general election was 74.18%, with 4,639,010 votes cast.

Democratic primary

Governor
The incumbent Governor, Dan Walker, had a contentious relationship with the Daley Machine, which backed Secretary of State Michael Howlett.  Walker carried most of the state's counties, but Howlett carried Cook county by a wide margin and was ultimately nominated.

Lieutenant Governor 
Incumbent Lieutenant Governor Neil Hartigan was renominated, defeating Metropolitan Water Reclamation District of Greater Chicago commissioner Joanne H. Alter.

Republican primary

Governor
Thompson won the Republican Primary in a landslide, carrying every county.

Lieutenant Governor
Dave O'Neal won the Republican primary, defeating Joan G. Anderson.

General election

References

1976
Gubernatorial
Illinois
November 1976 events in the United States